Heath Martin Schroyer (born March 15, 1972) is an American college basketball coach, currently the athletic director at McNeese State University, where he was head coach of the men's basketball team from 2018 until 2021. He has had previous head coaching stops at Portland State University (2002–05), University of Wyoming (2007–11) and University of Tennessee-Martin (2014–16).

Playing career 
Schroyer, born in Walkersville, Maryland, played high school basketball under head coach Morgan Wootten at DeMatha Catholic High School. Following high school, he was an All-Conference player at Kings River Community College before playing at Armstrong Atlantic State University, where he graduated in 1995 with a degree in liberal studies.

Coaching career 
Schroyer's coaching career began following graduation when he was an assistant for one year at Kings River, then served as an assistant under Steve Cleveland at Fresno City College.  When Cleveland became the coach at Brigham Young University in 1997, Schroyer followed him and spent the next four seasons as an assistant coach there.  He became an assistant at the University of Wyoming for the 2001–02 season before being hired as the head coach at Portland State University.

At the time of his hiring, Schroyer was the second-youngest coach in Division I, and his first team at Portland State won just five games.  In his third and final season at the school, Schroyer led the Vikings to a 19–9 record, including an 11–3 conference record and a Big Sky Conference championship.  Following the season, Schroyer rejoined Cleveland as the associate head coach at Fresno State University.

On February 8, 2011, Schroyer was fired from his head coaching job at the University of Wyoming after starting 8–15 and 1–8 in Mountain West Conference play and a 49–68 record in four years.  The final decision on his status at Wyoming came when he threatened not to coach unless he was given a contract extension. In May 2011, newly appointed UNLV Runnin' Rebels basketball coach Dave Rice announced that he had signed Schroyer on as an assistant.

Schroyer returned to head coaching when he accepted the position at the University of Tennessee at Martin on March 20, 2014. He stayed with the Skyhawks for two seasons, amassing a 41-28 record before leaving to take an assistant coaching position at North Carolina State under Mark Gottfried. The following season, Schroyer returned to BYU for his second stint as an assistant coach, joining Dave Rose's staff.

On March 15, 2018, Schroyer was named the head men's basketball coach at McNeese State, replacing Dave Simmons. He stepped down in 2021 to become athletic director.

Head coaching record

References

External links
BYU bio
NC State bio
UT Martin bio
UNLV bio
Wyoming bio
Portland State bio

1972 births
Living people
American men's basketball players
Armstrong State Pirates men's basketball players
Basketball coaches from Maryland
Basketball players from Maryland
BYU Cougars men's basketball coaches
College men's basketball head coaches in the United States
DeMatha Catholic High School alumni
Fresno State Bulldogs men's basketball coaches
Junior college men's basketball coaches in the United States
Junior college men's basketball players in the United States
McNeese Cowboys and Cowgirls athletic directors
McNeese Cowboys basketball coaches
People from Walkersville, Maryland
Portland State Vikings men's basketball coaches
Sportspeople from the Washington metropolitan area
UNLV Runnin' Rebels basketball coaches
Wyoming Cowboys basketball coaches